Goniaea furcifera is a species of grasshopper in the family Acrididae. It was described by Francis Walker in 1870.

Synonyms
The following are synonyms for this species:
Goniaea minipes Sjöstedt, 1920
Goniaea tristis (Sjöstedt, 1921)

References

furcifera
Insects described in 1870